"I Will Wait" is a song by British rock band Mumford & Sons. The track was first released in the United States on 7 August 2012 as the lead single from the band's second studio album, Babel (2012). The song sold 153,000 copies in the United States in its first week of release and became their highest-charting song in the US to date, peaking at number 12. It also reached the top ten in the United Kingdom, New Zealand, Irish, Canadian and Scottish national charts, and was voted into fifth place in Australian radio station Triple J's Hottest 100 of 2012. The song is playable in the video game Guitar Hero Live.

Music video
The music video was directed by Fred & Nick. It was filmed at Red Rocks Amphitheatre in Morrison, Colorado.

Critical reception
The song has received generally favourable reviews. Grady Smith of Entertainment Weekly gave the song a positive review, saying how the song "hearkens back to their Grammy-nomination-festooned single "The Cave" with its shouted refrain, triumphant horns, a driving kick drum, and an earnest lyric about a relationship so perfect it has Marcus Mumford kneeling down in reverence, raising his hands, and wishing for his mind to be "freed from the lies."" Stephanie Middleton of The Celebrity Cafe said, "With untouched vocals and harmonies, the boys manage to create yet another genuine Mumford & Sons track."

Katie Hasty of HitFix gave the song a B+, saying "Marcus is a softie, but he's got a problem with repetition," but also said "they bring it home when they jump up an octave and beat the hell out of the chorus." She concluded with, "This song could be really huge." Liv Carter of Urban Country News awarded the song a 'thumbs-up'. Reviewing the song after it started receiving airplay at country radio, she called it "a perfect piece of folk-rock that more than deserves to be introduced to the wider country radio audience." Rolling Stone magazine named the song the 13th best song of 2012.

Track listing

Awards

Charts

Weekly charts

Year-end charts

Certifications

Release history

References

External links

2012 singles
Mumford & Sons songs
Folk rock songs
2012 songs
Island Records singles
Songs written by Marcus Mumford
Song recordings produced by Markus Dravs